Oregocerata magna is a species of moth of the family Tortricidae. It is found in Napo Province, Ecuador.

The wingspan is 30 mm. The ground colour of the forewings is grey, tinged with brownish except for the terminal third and some small areas basally. The hindwings are cream, slightly tinged brownish towards the apex.

Etymology
The species name refers to the size of adult and is derived from Latin magna (meaning large).

References

Moths described in 2009
Euliini